"Tell It to My Heart" is a song by Italian production trio Meduza featuring Irish singer-songwriter and musician Hozier. It was released on 29 October 2021, via Island Records. The song was written by Neil Ormandy, Hozier, Sam Gray, Luca De Gregorio, Mattia Vitale and Simone Giani.

Background
In a press release on how the collaboration came about, Hozier stated: "Towards the end of a long period of weighing up what we've missed about night life and its spaces, and with it the communal buzz of dance floors and live electronic music, Meduza reached out to me with a song and it felt like the right time to lend my voice to a project outside my comfort zone."

Content
Jack Spilsbury of We Rave You wrote that "Tell It to My Heart" is about "a relationship that is taking a turn for the worst, something that everyone has gone through". The song is written in the key of B minor, with a tempo of 124 beats per minute.

Critical reception
Drew Barkin of EDM Tunes commented that the track "channels Meduza's signature sound" and Hozier's vocals "take the track to new heights".

Music video
An accompanying music video was released on 4 December 2021, and directed by Mónica G. Carter. It was starred Ian Gael Castro Hernandez, Sonia Lizet Hernandez and Yael Alexander Castro Hernandez. The video tells a story about the two brothers "who are fighting to keep their bond together".

Personnel
Credits adapted from Tidal.
 Luca De Gregorio – producer, composer, lyricist, associated performer, drum programing, mastering engineer, mixer, percussion, sound effects, studio personnel, synthesizer, vocal engineer, vocals
 Mattia Vitale – producer, composer, lyricist, associated performer, drum programing, mastering engineer, mixer, percussion, sound effects, studio personnel, synthesizer, vocal engineer, vocals
 Simone Giani – producer, composer, lyricist, associated performer, drum programing, mastering engineer, mixer, percussion, sound effects, studio personnel, synthesizer, vocal engineer, vocals
 Hozier – composer, lyricist, associated performer, vocals
 Neil Ormandy – composer, lyricist
 Sam Gray – composer, lyricist

Charts

Weekly charts

Year-end charts

Certifications

Release history

References

2021 songs
2021 singles
Meduza (producers) songs
Hozier (musician) songs
Songs written by Hozier (musician)
Songs written by Neil Ormandy
Island Records singles